Melicope waialealae is a species of flowering plant in the family Rutaceae. It is commonly known as Alani wai. It is endemic to the island of Kauai in Hawaii. It is found in small, bog hammocks.

References

waialealae
Endemic flora of Hawaii
Biota of Kauai
Trees of Hawaii
Taxonomy articles created by Polbot